Ragnarök is a Swedish prog-rock band, founded in Kalmar in 1972, by Peter Bryngelsson, Henrik Strindberg and Staffan Strindberg. Their first album was released 1976 by Silence Records.

Members of the band

1972–1978
Henrik Strindberg: Guitar, flute
Staffan Strindberg: Bass
Peter Bryngelsson: Guitar
Peder Nabo: Guitar, flute
Liselott Larsen: Vocals
Kosta-Mats Christiansson: Drums

1978–1980
Peter Bryngelsson: Bass, guitar
Thomas Wiegert: Drums
Dan Söderqvist: guitar
Peder Nabo: Piano, flute
Kjell Karlgren: Saxophone, piano
Ingmar Ljungström: Synthesizer

1980–1982
Peter Bryngelsson: Guitar
Kjell Karlgren: Saxophone, piano
Thomas Wiegert: Drums
Magnus Jarlbo: Trumpet, piano
Per Andersson: Bass

1982–1983
Peter Bryngelsson: Guitar, vocals
Kjell Karlgren: Saxophone, bass, vocals
Thomas Wiegert: Drums
Dan Jonsson: Guitar
Lars Liljegren: Marimba, organ

1983–2002
Thomas Wiegert: Drums
Kjell Karlgren: Saxophone, keyboard
Kent Ohlsson: Vocals, guitar

2003–2016
Peter Bryngelsson: Guitar, vocals
Peder Nabo: Piano, flute
Henrik Strindberg: Guitar, flute
Staffan Strindberg: Bass
Thomas Wiegert: Drums

2017–present
Peter Bryngelsson: Guitar, vocals
Peder Nabo: Piano, flute
Henrik Strindberg: Guitar, flute
Staffan Strindberg: Bass
Mikael Svanevik: Drums

Discography
Ragnarök (1976)
Fjärilar i magen (1979)
Fata Morgana (1981)
3 Signs (1983)
Well (1991)
Path (2008)
Live in Tokyo (2012)

External links
 ragnarokprogg.se
 Progg.se

Swedish progressive rock groups
Musical groups established in 1972
Silence Records artists